Jérôme Truyens (born 4 August 1987) is a Belgian international field hockey player. He plays for Royal Racing Club de Bruxelles in Brussels and is an attacker.

Jérôme Truyens is part of the national team that reached the 2008 Summer Olympics in Beijing by ending third at the 2007 European Championship in Manchester. At that 2007 tournament, during the little final Truyens scored the winning goal in the last minute against the German team. In the first game of Belgium at the Olympics in Beijing against Spain, he scored again. However, the Belgian team lost 4-2. Eventually Belgium ended at the ninth place. Also at the 2012 Summer Olympics in London he competed for the national team in the men's tournament, now reaching the fifth place. Truyens became European vice-champion with Belgium at the 2013 European Championship on home ground in Boom.

References

External links
 

1987 births
Living people
Belgian male field hockey players
Field hockey players at the 2008 Summer Olympics
Field hockey players at the 2012 Summer Olympics
Olympic field hockey players of Belgium
People from Uccle
Field hockey players at the 2016 Summer Olympics
Olympic silver medalists for Belgium
Olympic medalists in field hockey
Medalists at the 2016 Summer Olympics
Field hockey players from Brussels
2014 Men's Hockey World Cup players